Ron Fewchuk (born 28 October 1941 in Selkirk, Manitoba) was a member of the House of Commons of Canada from 1993 to 1997 at the Selkirk—Red River electoral district. He was a businessperson by career.

Fewchuk was a member of the Liberal party who served in the 35th Canadian Parliament. He did not seek a second term in office and left Canadian politics after the 1997 federal election.

References
 

1941 births
2017 deaths
Liberal Party of Canada MPs
Members of the House of Commons of Canada from Manitoba
People from Selkirk, Manitoba